Narcissus Road is the debut album by English Indie rock band The Hours. It is named after a road in West Hampstead, London NW6; a picture of the road sign is on the back cover.

Track listing 
All tracks composed by Antony Genn and Martin Slattery; except where indicated
"Ali in the Jungle" – 4:38
"Narcissus Road" – 3:50
"Back When You Were Good" (Genn, Slattery, Joey Waronker) – 5:29
"Love You More" – 3:06
"Icarus" – 3:30
"I Miss You" – 4:13
"Murder or Suicide" – 5:55
"Dive In" – 3:34
"I Need to Know" – 5:03
"People Say" – 6:28
"Let Me Breathe" – 5:14

Notes
The artwork for the album was created by British artist Damien Hirst.

Themes of the album include ruminations on the celebrities that songwriters Antony Genn and Martin Slattery have known in their previous careers as musicians, such as on the title track; love songs such as "Love You More"; uplifting exhortations to achieve, such as in "Ali in the Jungle"; and references and metaphors related to football.

"Ali in the Jungle" is the soundtrack to the Nike short film "Human Chain," which debuted as an advertisement during the 2010 Winter Olympics.

The song "Ali in the Jungle" was also featured in the EA Sports video game FIFA 08 and the 2K Sports game NBA 2K13

Singles & Eps

Ali in the Jungle
Released 6 November 2006.
UK Singles Chart: #113

CD and 7" vinyl
"Ali in the Jungle"
"Nothing"
"Greatest Comeback"
"Ali in the Jungle"

Love You More 
Released 1 November 2007.
UK Singles Chart: #194

Back When You Were Good
Released 22 January 2007
UK Singles Chart: #?

CD and 7" vinyl
"Back When You Were Good"
"For A Moment"
"Back When You Were Good"

2007 debut albums
The Hours (band) albums
A&M Records albums